John Waddell may refer to:
 John Waddell (engineer) (1828–1888), Scottish railway contractor
 John Alexander Low Waddell (1854–1938), American civil engineer and bridge designer
 John Waddell (politician) (1891–1939), Australian politician
 John Henry Waddell (1921–2019), American sculpture artist
 John Kenneth Waddell, former president of Allen University, Columbia, South Carolina
 John Newton Waddel (1812–1895), American clergyman, educator
 Rankin (photographer) (John Rankin Waddell, born 1966), British portrait and fashion photographer